Doig Airport  is a remote forest fire suppression airfield located in northwestern Alberta, Canada. "Doig" is just the name of the airfield's location, named for the Doig River; there is no community with that name.

The airfield is located on the Halveston Ridge of the Clear Hills, north of the Doig River.

References

External links
Page about this airport on COPA's Places to Fly airport directory

Registered aerodromes in Alberta
Clear Hills County